The Journal of Computer Assisted Tomography, abbreviated JCAT, is a bimonthly peer-reviewed medical journal covering medical imaging, with a particular focus on CT scans and magnetic resonance imaging. It was established in 1977 and is published by Wolters Kluwer Health. It is the official journal of SABI, the Society for Advanced Body Imaging. 

The editor-in-chief is Eric P. Tamm, MD (University of Texas and MD Anderson Cancer Center). According to the Journal Citation Reports, the journal has a 2020 impact factor of 1.826. 

The journal's title has often been mistakenly represented (in mentions and citations) as "Journal of Computed Assisted Tomography".

References

External links

Wolters Kluwer academic journals
Publications established in 1977
Bimonthly journals
English-language journals
Radiology and medical imaging journals